Rfissa is a Moroccan dish and is served during various traditional celebrations.

It is traditionally served with chicken and lentils and  fenugreek seeds (tifiḍas in Amazigh, helba in Arabic), msemmen, meloui or day-old bread, and the blend of ras el hanout.

It is traditional to serve rfissa to a woman who has just given birth, as fenugreek is purported to be beneficial for women that are recovering from child birth.

Rfissa is derived from tharid, a traditional Arab dish said to have been the Prophet Muhammad's favorite dish.

This dish did not appear in Moroccan cookbooks until the 1990s. The cultural historian Anny Gaul suggests that this might be due to the fact that rfissa is related to rural culinary traditions, whereas the people writing cookbooks for a long time were mostly Fesi elites.

See also 
 Couscous
 Tajine

References 

Arab cuisine
Moroccan cuisine